Jacques Golliet (14 December 1931 – 31 October 2020) was a French politician. He served as a Senator from Haute-Savoie from 28 September 1986 to 1 October 1995.

Biography
A professor and lecturer, Golliet began his political career as Mayor of Thônes in 1974, succeeding Joseph-François Angelloz. He then became General Councillor. He was elected to the Senate in 1986, representing Haute-Savoie, and staying in power until 1995. While at the Luxembourg Palace, he was a member of the Committee for Foreign Affairs, Defense and the Armed Forces. He was also one of the Senators behind the creation of the International Information Group on Tibet.

Jacques Golliet died on 31 October 2020 at the age of 88.

References

1931 deaths
2020 deaths
Politicians from Auvergne-Rhône-Alpes
Mayors of places in Auvergne-Rhône-Alpes
French Senators of the Fifth Republic
Union for French Democracy politicians
Centre of Social Democrats politicians